Shilokh Mission Hospital, founded as Jalalpur Hospital, is the oldest hospital of the city Jalalpur Jattan.

History
The hospital was founded by Dr Herbert Francis Lechmere Taylor (1872-1954) in 1900s in British India. It was the first hospital of the region, which started in a tent and gradually transformed into a well known hospital.
 
At present, it has the capacity of 250 beds. The hospital is run by a christian missionary associated with the Church of Scotland. It was taken on lease by the administration of Hashmat Medical and Dental College to serve as one of its three teaching hospitals and still running by Hashmat Medical College. Anwar Rehmat is the present medical director of the hospital.

References 

Hospitals in Punjab, Pakistan
Christian hospitals
Church of Scotland
1900s establishments in British India